Fouquerolles is a commune in the Oise department in northern France.

See also
 Communes of the Oise department

References

External links

 Fouquerolles : Postcards with views of the village since 1900. (Unofficial Website)

Communes of Oise